The flapnose ray or Javanese cownose ray (Rhinoptera javanica) is a species of fish in the family Rhinopteridae. It is found in the Indo-Pacific off China, India, Indonesia, Iran, Japan, Madagascar, Malaysia, Mozambique, Pakistan, the Philippines, Seychelles, Somalia, South Africa, Sri Lanka, Taiwan, Tanzania, Thailand, Vietnam and possibly Australia. Its natural habitats are open seas, shallow seas, subtidal aquatic beds, coral reefs, estuarine waters, and coastal saline lagoons.

References

flapnose ray
Fish of Indonesia
flapnose ray
Taxonomy articles created by Polbot